Esther Lewis, (1716-1794) was an English poet who published in the fashionable Bath Journal  and occasionally in the Gentleman's Magazine. She is also known by her pen name of Sylvia and her later married name of Esther Clark.

Biography
Esther Lewis was the daughter of a clergyman Rev John Lewis of Holt, Wiltshire. She had a mentor in Dr Samuel Bowden, her doctor who had treated her through a smallpox infection and who was impressed by her talent. Bowden regularly published his own poetry in the Bath Journal and, encouraged her to write and publish poetry there too. He promoted her with a poem of his own entitled To a Young Lady of Holt on her most Ingenious Poems (1749) 

After the death of her father she married Robert Clark of Tetbury in 1760 and moved there.

Her best known poem is Advice to a Young Lady Lately Married (1752). Her works were popular and reprinted over the subsequent decades. She arranged a collection of her own works at the prompting of her husband, which were published for charity in 1789, as Poems Moral and Entertaining. This contains a letter to an anonymous lady in London who is thought to be Sarah Fielding, sister of Henry Fielding, whom she had befriended at Bath around 1758.

She died at Tetbury in 1794  and is buried there.

References

External links 
 Advice to a Young Lady Lately Married , The poem at Poetrynook, Accessed April 2016

1716 births
1794 deaths
18th-century British poets
British women poets
18th-century English writers
18th-century English women writers
Pseudonymous women writers
18th-century pseudonymous writers